"Cheshire Cat Smile" is a song by English indie rock band Milburn and is featured on their debut album, Well Well Well. Released on 10 July 2006, it was the second single taken from the album and charted in the UK Top 40 at #32. The DVD features two live recordings taken at The Leadmill on 4 March 2006.

Track listing
CD (B000FL7AVG)
"Cheshire Cat Smile" (2:17)
"Belle of the Ball" (2:05)

7"(B000FL7BOW)
"Cheshire Cat Smile" (2:17)
"Belle of the Ball" (2:05)
"Lads 'n' Lasses" (2:16)

DVD (B000FL7BP6)
"Cheshire Cat Smile" (2:17)
"Belle of the Ball" (2:05)
"Cheshire Cat Smile" (video)
"Cheshire Cat Smile" (Live @ The Leadmill)
"Storm in a Teacup" (Live @ The Leadmill)

2006 singles
Milburn (band) songs
Song recordings produced by Dave Eringa
2006 songs
Mercury Records singles